Enzo Sergio Escobar Olivares (born November 10, 1951) is a retired football defender from Chile, who played for Club de Deportes Cobreloa. He represented Chile at the 1982 FIFA World Cup, wearing the number 20 jersey.

References

External links
 

1951 births
Chilean footballers
Association football defenders
Cobreloa footballers
Chile international footballers
1982 FIFA World Cup players
1979 Copa América players
Living people
Place of birth missing (living people)
People from Marga Marga Province